Manchi Manushulu is a 1974 Indian Telugu-language drama film produced & directed by V. B. Rajendra Prasad under his Jagapathi Art Pictures banner. It stars Sobhan Babu and Manjula, with music composed by K. V. Mahadevan. It is a remake of the Hindi film Aa Gale Lag Jaa (1973).

Plot
Radha (Manjula) is a medical student and daughter of a wealthy man, Raghupati Rao (Nagabhushanam). While on a trip to Simla, she meets and falls in love with Gopi (Sobhan Babu); they get intimate with each other. Gopi asks Raghupati Rao for his daughter's hand, but he refuses, on the ground that the hard-up Gopi is not worthy of her. Gopi leaves Radha a note, explaining that her father refused the alliance and that he is heading to meet his mother, who is very sick. Raghupati Rao gets hold of the letter before Radha. He changes the letter with a fake one that says Gopi is going away because Raghupati Rao has refused to provide any monetary compensation.

Years later, Gopi and Radha are fated to meet again. This time, Gopi is accompanied by a disabled boy, Babu (Master Tito), while Radha is about to get engaged to Dr. Ramesh (Jaggayya). It is revealed that Babu is Gopi and Radha's son. Gopi has come to Dr. Ramesh for Babu's treatment. Radha was pregnant when her father sent Gopi away. She gave birth to a baby, but her father told her that it was stillborn. Gopi took his son and promised Raghupati Rao that he would never tell Radha about the child. Dr. Ramesh treats Babu as Radha tries to hide her past from Dr. Ramesh. Radha learns the truth about Babu's birth and confronts her father, who confesses and asks her forgiveness while Babu is united with his parents.

Cast

 Sobhan Babu as Gopi
 Manjula as Radha
 Jaggayya as Dr. Ramesh
 Nagabhushanam as Raghupati Rao
 Anjali Devi as Seetamma 
 Raja Babu as 'Fatak' Rama Rao
 Dhulipala Dr. Anand
 Rao Gopal Rao as Dr. Murthy
 Mukkamala
 P. J. Sarma
 K. V. Chalam as Shopkeeper
 Sarathi as Shopkeeper
 Master Tito as Babu

Soundtrack

Box office
 The film ran for more than 100 days in ten centers and celebrated a Silver Jubilee in Hyderabad.

References

External links
 
 Listen to Manchi Manushulu songs at Raaga.com

1974 films
1974 drama films
Telugu remakes of Hindi films
Films scored by K. V. Mahadevan
1970s Telugu-language films
Films directed by V. B. Rajendra Prasad